Jan Reinderman (17 April 1886 – 31 July 1964) was a Dutch wrestler. He competed in the Greco-Roman middleweight event at the 1924 Summer Olympics.

References

External links
 

1886 births
1964 deaths
Olympic wrestlers of the Netherlands
Wrestlers at the 1924 Summer Olympics
Dutch male sport wrestlers
Sportspeople from Amsterdam